Pandesma submurina, the pale migrant, is a moth of the family Erebidae first described by Francis Walker in 1865. It is found in Australia in New South Wales, the Northern Territory, Queensland and Western Australia.

The wingspan is about 50 mm. Adults have brown forewings with indistinct darker markings. The hindwings are buff coloured with a large dark spot near the tornus.

The larvae probably feed on Fabaceae species.

References

Pandesmini
Moths described in 1865
Moths  of Australia
Taxa named by Francis Walker (entomologist)